House is an American television medical drama that originally ran on the Fox network for eight seasons, from November 16, 2004 to May 21, 2012. The show centers around Dr. Gregory House (Hugh Laurie), a drug-addicted, unconventional, misanthropic medical genius who leads a team of diagnosticians at the fictional hospital in New Jersey. Throughout its run, the show has been widely popular with audiences,  and has been well received by the critics community.

As a result, by the end of its run, the show had been nominated 169 times for awards presented by American organizations, including at least ten times each for the Primetime Emmy Awards, Teen Choice Awards, People's Choice Awards, NAACP Image Awards, and Prism Awards. It won the awards a total of 56 times, which included multiple wins also at the Golden Globe Awards, Young Artist Awards, BMI Film & TV Awards, Satellite Awards, Golden Reel Awards, TCA Awards, Screen Actors Guild Awards, Humanitas Prizes, and WGA Awards.

The show has been very successful internationally also, being aired in 2008 in a total of 66 countries, and with audience of over 81.8 million worldwide, it was the most watched television show on the globe that year. As a result, it received ten nominations for international awards, including once for a BAFTA TV Award (U.K.) and for a Golden Nymph (won, Monaco).

Hugh Laurie, who portrays the title character, has been nominated for an award 38 times, winning 14 of them. Omar Epps has been nominated eight times, winning three awards, while Olivia Wilde has been nominated five times for an award. Besides the show's cast members, the writers and producers of the show have also been nominated for various awards; writer, show-runner, executive producer and director David Shore, has received ten nominations for his work on the show, winning three times.

Emmy Awards

The Emmy Awards have been awarded annually since 1949 by the Academy of Television Arts & Sciences to honor excellence in television. They are considered to be one of the four major awards in America for the performing arts — together with the Academy Awards (film), Tony Awards (theatre) and Grammy Awards (music).  House has been nominated for Primetime Emmy Awards, which are given to honor excellence in acting and writing in primetime television, as well as Creative Arts Emmys, which are presented in recognition of technical and other related areas in American television programming.

After its first season run in 2005, House received five Emmy Award nominations, of which three were for Creative Arts Emmys. It failed to gain a nomination for Outstanding Drama Series but did, however, win the award for Outstanding Writing for a Drama Series.  The show did get nominated for Outstanding Drama Series in 2006, 2007, 2008, and 2009, but did not manage to win the award in either of these four nominations. In 2006 House was nominated for four Emmys, but failed to win. Next year, the show received four nominations, and won a Creative Arts Emmy for make-up. The following year, at the 60th Primetime Emmy Awards, the show, again, received four nominations but only received one Primetime Emmy Award, for director Greg Yaitanes for Outstanding Directing in a Drama Series. House received another three nominations in 2009 and in 2010, and two more nominations in 2011. However, it only won two Creative Arts Emmy Awards for sound mixing in 2009 and 2011, and failed to win any nominations altogether in 2012 for its final season.

Hugh Laurie, who portrays the title character has been nominated for the Primetime Emmy Award for Outstanding Lead Actor in a Drama Series for every season except the second and the last one. Despite the six nominations, Laurie has never won the award, which has been regarded by some critics in the entertainment industry as among the biggest snubs in the award's history.

Primetime Emmy Awards

: Katie Jacobs, David Shore, Bryan Singer, Thomas L. Moran, Russel Friend,  Garrett Lerner, Doris Egan, David Semel, Matt Witten, Gerrit van der Meer & Lawrence Kaplow.
: David Shore, Katie Jacobs, Paul Attanasio, Bryan Singer, Daniel Sackheim, Russel Friend, Garrett Lerner, Thomas L. Moran, Doris Egan, Lawrence Kaplow, Gerrit van der Meer, Peter Blake & Leonard Dick.

Creative Arts Emmys

BMI Film & TV Awards
The BMI Film & TV Awards are presented annually by Broadcast Music Incorporated to the composers of music featured in successful films, TV series and programs. Three composers from House, Robert Del Naja, Grant Marshall and Andrew Vowles, have received the award every year between 2005 and 2011.

Golden Globe Awards

The Golden Globe Awards are awarded annually by the Hollywood Foreign Press Association "to honor the best achievements in film and television." House has been nominated for a total of nine. The show has won two Golden Globes, which were for Hugh Laurie in the Best Performance by an Actor in a Television Series – Drama category in 2006 and 2007. Laurie has been nominated four more times between 2008 and 2011, while the series was also nominated in the category Best Drama Series in 2008, 2009, and 2010.

Golden Reel Awards
The Golden Reel Awards are presented annually by the Motion Picture Sound Editors to sound editors. House has been nominated in various categories seven times, and has won three.

: Craig Rosevear, Matthew Mondrick, Luis Galdames, Kirk Herzbrun, Alex Parker, Paul Stevenson,  Harry Woolway, Michael Lyle, Rich Weingart & Brad North.

: Kirk Herzbrun, Alex Parker, Matthew Mondrick, Joe DeAngelis, Harry Woolway, Paul Stevenson, Brad North, Craig Rosevear, Luis Galdames & Michael Lyle.

Humanitas Prizes
The Humanitas Prizes are awarded each year for film and television writing intended to promote human dignity, meaning, and freedom. House has been nominated six times for the 60 Minute Teleplay category and has won once. In 2012, the show received the Goodbye with Love Humanitas Prize, being the first recipient of this new award honoring long-running series that have ended.

NAACP Image Awards
The NAACP Image Awards are presented annually by the American National Association for the Advancement of Colored People to honor outstanding people of color in film, television, music, and literature. The show has received 12 nominations in total, including seven for Omar Epps in the "Outstanding Actor in a Drama Series" and the "Outstanding Supporting Actor in a Drama Series" categories.

People's Choice Awards

The People's Choice Awards are voted by fans online to recognize the people and the work of popular culture. House has received 13 nominations, winning nine.

Prism Awards
The PRISM Awards are awarded annually by the Entertainment Industries Council to honor artists for accurate portrayal of substance abuse, addiction and mental health in entertainment programming. House has been nominated ten times, winning in 2007 for "TV Drama Series Multi-Episode Storyline".

Satellite Awards

The Satellite Awards are presented annually by the International Press Academy to the "best of the entertainment industry". House has won five awards, Including Best Drama series in 2005 and 2006.

Screen Actors Guild Awards

The Screen Actors Guild (SAG) honors its members annually with awards for outstanding acting in film and television. House has been nominated for seven awards, six of which were for Hugh Laurie for Outstanding Performance by a Male Actor in a Drama Series, winning two of them.

: Lisa Edelstein, Omar Epps, Peter Jacobson, Hugh Laurie, Robert Sean Leonard, Jennifer Morrison, Kal Penn, Jesse Spencer & Olivia Wilde.

Teen Choice Awards

The Teen Choice Awards are voted on by teenagers online and honor the year's biggest achievements in television, film, music, sports and fashion. House has received 16 nominations, including four for Olivia Wilde, and three for Hugh Laurie. Laurie has won in 2007 for the Teen Choice Award for Choice TV Actor: Drama.

TCA Awards
The TCA Awards are presented annually by the Television Critics Association for outstanding achievements in television. House has been nominated seven times, twice for Outstanding Achievement in Drama. Laurie has been nominated four times, winning twice in 2005 and 2006.

Writers Guild of America Awards

The Writers Guild of America presents annual awards for outstanding achievements in film, television, and radio.
House has been nominated for four awards in the Episodic Drama category, winning in 2006 and in 2010.

Young Artist Awards
The Young Artist Awards are presented annually by the Young Artist Foundation to recognize excellence of youth performers. Actors have been nominated nine times for their performances on House, winning two awards.

Other U.S. awards
House has been nominated for awards at various Guild and society ceremonies. Show creator David Shore also received an award from the Lupus Foundation of America, for raising awareness for Lupus, a disease mentioned frequently on the show.  The American Film Institute selected the show as one of the best television programs of 2005. The same year, House received a Peabody Award for achievement in electronic media, it also received two PGA Award nominations in 2006 and 2007.

International awards

House has been nominated for awards at various festivals and society ceremonies outside of United States for the best foreign or international TV series. These include a British Academy Television Awards nomination in 2007,  and winning the "Golden Nymph" award at Monte-Carlo Television Festival in 2009. The show has also received nominations from the German Goldene Kamera, and the Spanish "TP de Oro"  and "Premios Ondas," while  Martin Henderson has received a nomination by the Australian Film Institute for the International Award for the best actor for his appearance in the episode "Painless".

References

General

Specific

External links
 

Awards
House